The Mavourneen Rocks is a group of four steep, rocky islets that lie within Port Davey, an oceanic inlet, located in the south west region of Tasmania, Australia.

Features and location
Part of the Breaksea Islands Group, the Mavourneen Rocks are part of the Port Davey Islands Important Bird Area, so identified by BirdLife International because of its importance for breeding seabirds. Recorded breeding seabird species are the little penguin (20 pairs), Pacific gull, silver gull and sooty oystercatcher.

See also

 List of islands of Tasmania

References

Islands of South West Tasmania